WZHD (97.1 FM) is a classic hits-formatted radio station licensed to Canaseraga, New York, United States. It serves the Hornell/Dansville area and simulcasts programming from WPHD (98.7 FM), serving the Elmira, New York radio market. The station is owned by Seven Mountains Media.

On July 3, 2020, WZHD, along with its then-simulcast partner WPHD (96.1 FM), changed their call letters to WOBF and WCBF respectively, and flipped to country as "Bigfoot Country 95, 96, & 97", with both stations trimulcasting on WQBF. This was part of a five station format swap that was done by Seven Mountains Media, the owner of WOBF.

On June 18, 2021, WOBF changed their call letters back to WZHD and switched from a simulcast of WCBF back to a simulcast of classic hits-formatted WPHD (98.7 FM).

References

External links

ZHD
Radio stations established in 2009
2009 establishments in New York (state)
Classic hits radio stations in the United States